Dino Cinel was an Italian-American historian, priest and a Distinguished Professor of Italian-American Studies at City University of New York.

Life
In 1988, he was a Roman Catholic priest at St. Rita's Church, New Orleans.  
He was investigated over his possession of homosexual child pornography.
He sued over the public release of the information.

He taught at Tulane University.
The scholarship of his book, From Italy to San Francisco, has been questioned.

Cinel was stabbed to death in Medellin, Colombia in February 2018 by an 18-year-old man with whom he had been in a relationship.

Awards
 1984 Merle Curti Award in Social History

Works

References

External links
"Review: The National Integration of Italian Return Migration, 1870-1929 by Dino Cinel, The Historical Journal, Vol. 35, No. 4 (Dec., 1992), pp. 1004-1005

Asesinan en Medellín a exsacerdote italiano envuelto en pornografía. El Tiempo; Medellin, Colombia, Feb. 3, 2018.

Italian LGBT writers
American LGBT writers
1941 births
2018 deaths
20th-century Italian historians
City University of New York faculty
Tulane University faculty
Catholic Church sexual abuse scandals
20th-century Italian Roman Catholic priests
Deaths by stabbing in Colombia
American people murdered abroad
People murdered in Colombia
20th-century American Roman Catholic priests
21st-century LGBT people